Whoomp! (There It Is) is the debut album by the rap duo Tag Team. The album was released on July 20, 1993 for Bellmark Records and Life Records and was produced by Steve Roll'n and DC the Brain Supreme.

Reception
The album made it to No. 39 on the Billboard 200 and No. 28 on the R&B albums chart and was certified Gold by the RIAA. The single, "Whoomp! (There It Is)", reached No. 2 on the Billboard Hot 100 and No. 4 on the Hot Rap Singles chart. Another single, "U Go Girl", also charted.

Track listing
"Whoomp! (There It Is)"
"U Go Girl"
"Free Style"
"Just Call Me DC"
"It's Somethin'"
"Get Nasty"
"Bring It On'"
"Funk Key"
"Gettin' Phat"
"Bobyahead"
"Wreck da Set"
"Drop Dem"
"Kick da Flow"

References 

1993 debut albums
Tag Team (group) albums